In geometry, the rectified truncated icosahedron is a convex polyhedron. It has 92 faces: 60 isosceles triangles, 12 regular pentagons, and 20 regular hexagons. It is constructed as a rectified, truncated icosahedron, rectification truncating vertices down to mid-edges.

As a near-miss Johnson solid, under icosahedral symmetry, the pentagons are always regular, although the hexagons, while having equal edge lengths, do not have the same edge lengths with the pentagons, having slightly different but alternating angles, causing the triangles to be isosceles instead. The shape is a symmetrohedron with notation I(1,2,*,[2])

Images

Dual
By Conway polyhedron notation, the dual polyhedron can be called a joined truncated icosahedron, jtI, but it is topologically equivalent to the rhombic enneacontahedron with all rhombic faces.

Related polyhedra
The rectified truncated icosahedron can be seen in sequence of rectification and truncation operations from the truncated icosahedron. Further truncation, and alternation operations creates two more polyhedra:

See also 
 Near-miss Johnson solid
 Rectified truncated tetrahedron
 Rectified truncated octahedron
 Rectified truncated cube
 Rectified truncated dodecahedron

References

 Coxeter Regular Polytopes, Third edition, (1973), Dover edition,  (pp. 145–154 Chapter 8: Truncation)
 John H. Conway, Heidi Burgiel, Chaim Goodman-Strauss, The Symmetries of Things 2008,

External links 
 George Hart's Conway interpreter: generates polyhedra in VRML, taking Conway notation as input

Polyhedra